Juan Calzadilla (Altagracia de Orituco, 1931) is a Venezuelan poet, painter, and art critic.

Education 
He studied in the  Universidad Central de Venezuela and in the Instituto Pedagógico Nacional.

Artistic Life 
He is co-founder of the group  El techo de la ballena (1961), and Imagen magazine (1984). Calzadilla represented Venezuela at the 57th Venice Art Biennale.

Works
Dictado por la jauría (1962)
Malos modales (1968)
Oh smog (1978)
Antología paralela (1988)
Minimales (1993)
Principios de Urbanidad (1997)
Corpolario (1998)
Diario sin sujeto (1999)
Aforemas (2004)
 Vela de armas (2008)
 Noticias del alud (2009)

Awards
 National Prize of Plastic Arts of Venezuela, 1996.

References

External links
El poder de la palabra 
Poemas

1931 births
Living people
Venezuelan painters
Venezuelan male writers
Venezuelan contemporary artists